Ebenus is a genus of flowering plants in the family Fabaceae. It belongs to the subfamily Faboideae.

Species 

Ebenus argentea 
Ebenus armitagei 
Ebenus barbigera 
Ebenus boissieri 
Ebenus bourgaei 
Ebenus cappadocica 
Ebenus cretica 
Ebenus depressa 
Ebenus haussknechtii 
Ebenus hirsuta 
Ebenus lagopus 
Ebenus laguroides 
Ebenus longipes 
Ebenus macrophylla 
Ebenus pinnata 
Ebenus pisidica 
Ebenus plumosa 
Ebenus reesei 
Ebenus sibthorpii 
Ebenus stellata 
Ebenus zekiyeae

References 

 Encyclopedia of Life entry
 GBIF entry

Hedysareae
Fabaceae genera